Gauruncus armatus is a species of moth of the family Tortricidae. It is found in Morona-Santiago Province, Ecuador.

The wingspan is 17 mm. The ground colour of the forewings is greyish brown, with brownish-cream dots. The hindwings are brownish grey.

Etymology
The species name refers to the form of the sacculus and is derived from Latin armatus (meaning armed).

References

Moths described in 2006
Euliini
Moths of South America
Taxa named by Józef Razowski